Kalotina Island is a rocky island lying 470 m north of Quinton Point, Goten Peninsula on the northwest coast of Anvers Island in the Palmer Archipelago, Antarctica.  The feature is 630 m long in southeast-northwest direction and 350 m wide, and separated from Temenuga Island to the east by a 140 m wide passage.

The island is named after the settlement of Kalotina in Western Bulgaria.

Location
British mapping in 1980.

Maps
 British Antarctic Territory. Scale 1:200000 topographic map.  DOS 610 Series, Sheet W 64 62.  Directorate of Overseas Surveys, UK, 1980.
 Antarctic Digital Database (ADD). Scale 1:250000 topographic map of Antarctica. Scientific Committee on Antarctic Research (SCAR). Since 1993, regularly upgraded and updated.

References

 Bulgarian Antarctic Gazetteer. Antarctic Place-names Commission. (details in Bulgarian, basic data in English)
 Kalotina Island. SCAR Composite Antarctic Gazetteer.

External links
 Kalotina Island. Copernix satellite image

Islands of the Palmer Archipelago
Bulgaria and the Antarctic